The 2012–13 season of the Women's BeNe League was the first season of the Belgium and the Netherlands' women's football top level league. Since this was the first season, the league had no reigning champion, although both countries had reigning champions from their former top leagues—Standard Liège in Belgium and ADO Den Haag in the Netherlands. The season started on 24 August 2012. The championship was won by FC Twente.

Format
The season began with a national phase, involving eight teams in each nation. The teams then played a double round-robin, resulting in 14 matches per team. The best four teams from each nation then qualified for the BeNe League A. The other teams joined the BeNe League B. The best team of each country in League A qualified for the 2013–14 UEFA Women's Champions League.

Teams
Teams were required to apply for league places. 11 Belgium teams asked for a license, 9 teams got a license.  Dutch teams have to apply until 31 May 2011. On 5 June the teams will be fixed. On 5 June the KNVB announced that 9 Dutch teams will join the BeNe league. On 11 June VVV-Venlo decided with FCE/PSV to withdraw from the BeNe League.

First stage

BeNe League Red (Belgium)

BeNe League  Orange (Netherlands)

Second stage

BeNe League A
Standard has secured the Champions League spot as best placed Belgium team.

BeNe League B

Topscorers
Below are the scorers of the single stages. There was no official top-scorer award given this year.

First stage

Updated to games played on 21 December 2012
Source: uk.women.soccerway.com

Updated to games played on 22 December 2012
Source: uk.women.soccerway.com

Second stage

Updated to games played on 27 May 2013
Source: uk.women.soccerway.com

Updated to games played on 26 May 2013
Source: uk.women.soccerway.com

References

BeNe League
BeNe League
1
BeNe League